KDRI may refer to:

 KDRI (AM), a radio station (830 AM) licensed to Tucson, Arizona, United States.
 KANM (FM), a radio station (90.3 FM) licensed to serve Grants, New Mexico, United States, which held the call sign KDRI from 2012 to 2017
 Beauregard Regional Airport (ICAO code KDRI)